Viktor Modzolevsky (13 April 1943 – 20 November 2011) was a Soviet fencer. He won a silver medal in the team épée event at the 1968 Summer Olympics and a bronze in the same event at the 1972 Summer Olympics. He was a coach of the Russian national team in the 1990s.

Modzolevsky died in a road accident on 20 November 2011 in way Tula - Voronezh (Don Highway).  He was 68.

References

1943 births
2011 deaths
Soviet male épée fencers
Kazakhstani male épée fencers
Olympic fencers of the Soviet Union
Fencers at the 1968 Summer Olympics
Fencers at the 1972 Summer Olympics
Fencers at the 1976 Summer Olympics
Olympic silver medalists for the Soviet Union
Olympic bronze medalists for the Soviet Union
Olympic medalists in fencing
People from Aktobe
Road incident deaths in Russia
Medalists at the 1968 Summer Olympics
Medalists at the 1972 Summer Olympics